Rahim (Raḥīm , also anglicized as Raheem) is one of the names of Allah in Islam, meaning "Merciful", from the root R-Ḥ-M. It is also used as a personal male name, short for Abdu r-Raḥīm "Servant of the Merciful". Spellings include Rahim, Raheem, Rohim and Roheem.

Given name
 Abdul Rahim Khan-i-Khanan, poet and minister in the Mughal Empire
 Rahim Abdullah, American football player
 Rahim Ademi (born 1954), Croatian Army general
 Raheem Beyah (born 1976), American computer scientist
 Raheem J. Brennerman, American businessman
 Raheem Blackshear (born 1999), American football player
 Raheem Brock, American football player
 Rahim Jaffer, Canadian politician
 Rahim Jahani, Afghan singer
 Raheem Jarbo, rapper better known as "Mega Ran"
 Raheem Kassam, British politician and journalist
 Raheem Layne (born 1999), American football player
 Rahim Mehryar, Afghan singer
 Rahim Moore, American football player
 Raheem Morris, American football coach 
 Raheem Orr, American football player
 Raheem Sterling, English footballer
 Rahim Ullah (died 1861), Bengali rebel 
 Rahim Zafer, Turkish footballer

Surname
 Esther Rahim, Pakistani painter
 Hafiz Rahim, Singaporean footballer
 Mohd Safiq Rahim, Malaysian footballer
 Mushfiqur Rahim, Bangladeshi cricketer
 Sameer Rahim, British literary journalist and novelist
 Tahar Rahim (born 1981), French actor

In fiction
Rohim, a school pupil played by Wasim Islam in the British web series Corner Shop Show

Raheem Porter, from Juice (1992)

See also
 Radio Raheem, a character in the film Do The Right Thing
 Rahimuddin Khan, Pakistani general
 Rahman, elative of Rahim

Arabic masculine given names
Arabic-language surnames
Names of God in Islam
Surnames